Gilford High School (GHS) is the public high school in Gilford, New Hampshire. Accredited by the New England Association of Schools and Colleges, Gilford is a comprehensive public school housing grades 9 through 12, serving the towns of Gilford and Gilmanton.

Extracurricular activities
Student groups and activities include Amnesty International, book club, coffee house, drama, environmental club, Friends of Rachel, French club, Granite State Challenge, homework club, Interact, literary magazine, math team, National Honor Society, robotics club, SADD, snowboard club, Spanish club, student council, varsity club, and yearbook

Gilford High School is a member of the New Hampshire Interscholastic Athletic Association in division III. The teams, known as the Golden Eagles, compete in baseball, basketball, cross country, field hockey, football, ice hockey, lacrosse, golf, skiing, soccer, softball, swimming, tennis, track and field, and volleyball.

In the 1990s, the school soccer team, under coach Dave Pinkham, went 9 years without losing a game (the team was state champion each year). Gilford varsity holds many national records including most consecutive championships (10), most consecutive games without a loss (133), and fewest goals allowed in a season (1). During the 2002 season they were also ranked as high as #24 in the nation in the National Soccer Coaches Association of America poll. The Gilford High School volleyball team, under coach Joan Forge, won nine consecutive state championships from 1999 to 2007.

Notable alumni
David Cote, arts journalist, playwright and opera librettist
Stefan Defregger, professional soccer player for the Wilmington Hammerheads
Chris Sheridan, television screenwriter for Family Guy

References

External links

Gilford High School official website

Schools in Belknap County, New Hampshire
Public high schools in New Hampshire
Gilford, New Hampshire